Verita is a genus of spiders in the family Gnaphosidae. It was first described in 2016 by Ramírez & Grismado. , it contains only one species, Verita williamsi, from Argentina.

References

Gnaphosidae
Monotypic Araneomorphae genera
Spiders of Argentina